Santos Motoapohua de la Torre (born April 28, 1942 in Santa Catarina Cuexcomatitlán, Jalisco) is one of the most world renowned Huichol artists. His works aims to capture the mystery and magnificence of Wixárika's cosmogony and his main works are located in places like Paris, Chicago, Zacatecas and Nayarit. The meaning of his huichol name, “Motoapohua”, is “Echo of the mountain”.

Bio 

Since a young age, Santos de la Torre lived in extreme poverty, however, on his conversations with Mexican writer Fernando Alarriba, as soon as he had his first experience with Hikuri (peyote) he found a mystic reality that he gradually understood with the help of his father, a Mara'akame (huichol Chaman) that guided him in the interpretation of his visions and dreams.

His artistic career started at 23 years old, right at the top moment of huichol contemporary art, portrayed globally by artists like José Benítez Sánchez and Tutukila Carrillo Sandoval. His brother, Jesus, asked him to travel to Mexico City to sell arts and crafts and learn basic techniques of huichol art crafting. It was in Mexico City where young Santos learned Spanish and where he started in the creation of works based on personal designs. In 1968 he meet John C. Lilly and his wife Colette, who, mesmerized by his work bought his first works and asked him more information about the enigmatic huichol culture. Santos agreed to take them to the community of Santa Catarina where the couple made a crucial documentary task for expanding and protecting huichol culture internationally at the top of the psicodelia culture.

With Lilly's protection, the artist met architect Eduardo Terrazas who invited him to collaborate with team of huichol artists that took part on creating an identity logo for the 1968 Summer Olympics. His collaboration continued for various years and it allowed him to take part in contemporary art projects like Tablas, which took places at Palacio de Bellas Artes in 1972, in which Terrazas made a visual exploration of geometric structures inspired on huichol art. At the end of the 70's he made a series of woodblocks with yarn, symbol of the SAHOP under the leadoff architect Pedro Ramirez Vazquez.

Santos de la Torre's life in Mexico City allowed him observe the enormous value of the art of his ethnic group, nationally and internationally, but then he came into a big leap of uncertainty and repulsion due to the exploitation towards huichol artist and craftsman that took him to isolate at the heart of Jalisco's Sierra and stop creating art for almost 10 years.

Besides working on the field, Santos started looking for new ways of expressions, that, besides from being groundbreaking, meant a deep experience when it came to myths, Gods, ancestors and principles that created the huichol cosmogony. This is how he and his family created Sonido de Musico, composed by 100 pieces of 15 x 15 cm that will become the mark of murals that ended up making his career on a global level. In 1993 he obtained resources from the Programa de Fomento a Proyectos y Coinversiones Culturales del Fondo Nacional para la Cultura y las Artes with his work Misterio y viaje de los tres espíritus sagrados.

After this work came Pensamiento y alma huichol (1997) located at the Palais-Royal Musée du Louvre station in Paris; Visión de un mundo místico (2001) located at Museo Zacatecano; El nuevo amanecer (2003) which belongs to the “Folk art” collection at the National Museum of Mexican Art in Chicago; Eco de la montaña (Echo of the Mountain) (2014), centerpiece of Nicolas Echavarria's documentary, and Diosa madre del caballo, Xotori K`kyari (2016), at the Hotel Playa Tierra Tropical located in San Francisco, Rivera Nayarit.

In 2016 he exhibited his work in Mazatlán, which seek establishing a dialog between the huichol people and the Haida people, from Canada, through art. He has also show his work in Zacatecas and Mexico City

In 2017, the Congress of the State of Jalisco gave him the Order “José Clemente Orozco” for his distinguished work in the painting field. Nowadays, Santos de la Torre continues creating arts at small, medium and grand format, and also maintains, along his family, a crafts workshop.

Meaning of his work 

Santos de la Torre was the object of interviews and articles in 2014 (from the Prize of the Press that the film Eco de la montaña received at the 29th Festival Internacional de Cine en Guadalajara) in which he explained that his murals should be seen from bottom to top, like trees grow, and that making one took about eight months.

He uses Czech beads made from glass, pine wood as a base and Campeche wax as glue. However, far from his technical mastery in crafting with these and other materials, the artist considers that the highlight of his work is due to an insatiable search for expressing his experiences and knowledge about the huichol culture.

De la Torre has gone on pilgrimages in all sacred territories of the Wixárika people, and bases his work in personal visions like on explanations about rituals and chants of the Mara´akames; from a tender age he has practiced meditation, dream interpretation, and stayed close to the ancestral memory of the huichol community thru the use of peyote. On his interviews with Fernando Alarriba, the artist pointed that the mission of the huichol art consists in offering a close up to the roots of sacred deities of life that manifest and have been inmortalizad since memorial times in rituals, shamanic chants, ceremonies and artistic expressions of his community.

Another topic less pointed in Santos work has been the role that his family has in the creation of each work. His wife Graciela used to help tracing his drawings, as well knitting and colocating beads. His sons and grandchildren also participate in the creation of his works, all of them made from sketches and original concepts of Santos and designed from his guidance.

Palais-Royal Huichol mural 

Pensamiento y alma huichol  was created in 1997 for Palais Royal-Musée du Louvre station as part of the RATP - Mexico City Metro alliance. This is his most renowned and talked about work, which represents huichol deities, ancestors, myths, flora and fauna on a horizontal tripctic of the underground, the earth and the sky. The work is composed by 80 boards and elaborated with two million beads of 2 millimeters each one. It is located at the Palais-Royal Musée du Louvre towards the Carrousel du Louvre. On this work, researcher Miguel Gleason comments on his book México insólito en Europa: “Its perhaps the most impressive and detailed work in Europe, composed by more of 2 million beads that shows the cosmogony of that community (huichol people)”.

Despise the international renown of this work, Santos de la Torre didn't receive the payment agreed by the Government of Mexico during the presidency of Ernesto Zedillo, nor he got invited to the ignauration of this mural, plus this was not installed the way it should be, being fixed later.

Filmarker Nicolas Echavarria took this incident at the beginning of Eco de la montaña, a film focused on the elaboration of a new mural that works like a trip to the spectator to dive into the rituals, beliefs, symbols and visions of the huichol community. Thanks to this film, Santos de la Torre was again the center of attention of Mexican art and allowed him to travel to places like UAE and Germany, expanding the list of countries that have welcomed thanks to his work that also include France and India.

References

Mexican artists
Artists from Jalisco
Living people
1942 births